Olson Peaks are two close-lying peaks, the higher 1,335 m, standing 4 nautical miles (7 km) west of Cape Lankester on the north side of Bertoglio Glacier. Mapped by the United States Geological Survey (USGS) from tellurometer surveys and Navy air photos, 1959–63. Named by Advisory Committee on Antarctic Names (US-ACAN) for Gary D. Olson, a member of the U.S. Army aviation support unit for Topo North and Topo South (1961–62) which conducted the tellurometer surveys.

Mountains of the Ross Dependency
Hillary Coast